The 1992 NCAA Skiing Championships were contested at the Wildcat Mountain Ski Area in Jackson, New Hampshire as the 39th annual NCAA-sanctioned ski tournament to determine the individual and team national champions of men's and women's collegiate slalom and cross-country skiing in the United States.

Vermont, coached by Chip LaCasse, claimed their fourth overall team championship and third as a co-ed team.

Venue

This year's NCAA skiing championships were hosted by the Wildcat Mountain Ski Area near Jackson, New Hampshire.

These were the sixth championships held in the state of New Hampshire (previously 1958, 1964, 1970, 1978, and 1984).

Program

Men's events
 Cross country, 20 kilometer classical
 Cross country, 10 kilometer freestyle
 Slalom
 Giant slalom

Women's events
 Cross country, 15 kilometer classical
 Cross country, 5 kilometer freestyle
 Slalom
 Giant slalom

Team scoring

 DC – Defending champions

See also
 List of NCAA skiing programs

References

1992 in sports in New Hampshire
NCAA Skiing Championships
NCAA Skiing Championships
1992 in alpine skiing
1992 in cross-country skiing